Block Island Sound is a strait in the open Atlantic Ocean, approximately  wide, separating Block Island from the coast of mainland Rhode Island. On the west, it extends to Montauk Point on the eastern tip of Long Island, as well as Plum Island, Gardiners Island, and Fishers Island, all in the state of New York.

Geographically, Block Island Sound extends west to Long Island Sound and east to Rhode Island Sound.

Three United States Navy warships have been named after the sound.  See USS Block Island.

References

Straits of New York (state)
Straits of Rhode Island
Intracoastal Waterway
New Shoreham, Rhode Island
Bodies of water of Washington County, Rhode Island